Niorouhio is a village in southern Ivory Coast. It sits on the border of Bas-Sassandra and Gôh-Djiboua Districts. Half of the village is in the sub-prefecture of Guéyo, Guéyo Department, Nawa Region, Bas-Sassandra District, and the other half is in the sub-prefecture of Doukouyo, Gagnoa Department, Gôh Region, Gôh-Djiboua District.

Niorouhio was a commune until March 2012, when it became one of 1126 communes nationwide that were abolished.

Notes

Former communes of Ivory Coast
Populated places in Bas-Sassandra District
Populated places in Gôh-Djiboua District
Populated places in Nawa Region
Populated places in Gôh